"Sentimental Lady" is an instrumental by Duke Ellington featuring Johnny Hodges on alto saxophone first recorded in 1942. "Sentimental Lady" reached number one on the Harlem Hit Parade in 1943 and was the B-side to Duke Ellington's previous number one, "A Slip Of the Lip (Can Sink a Ship)", which had reached the top spot a week before. In 1944 Ellington recorded a version with lyrics written by Bob Russell under the title I Didn't Know About You.

References

1943 songs
Songs with music by Duke Ellington